Bookshop is an online book marketplace founded in January 2020. Its stated mission is "to financially support local, independent bookstores."

Bookshop, a privately held company, has been certified as a B Corporation.

History 

Bookshop was founded by publisher Andy Hunter, who had previously co-founded Literary Hub and Electric Literature. It is a collaboration between Hunter, the American Booksellers Association, and the book wholesaler Ingram.  

On November 2, 2020 Bookshop opened a branch in the United Kingdom in partnership with wholesaler Gardners Books, which runs a similar profit sharing program with independent bookshops in that country.

Model 

Bookshop, operating on an affiliate marketing model, receives and fulfills orders for independent booksellers through its online storefront and returns a set portion of profits to the bookseller. Bookshop lets authors, publishers, and reviewers also sign up as affiliates. 

Bookshop, conceived as a response to Amazon's industry dominance, has set the goal of claiming 1% of the $3.1 billion in United States book sales handled by Amazon as of late 2019. Its strategy is to offer an online storefront with the accessibility and convenience of Amazon and, by convincing media outlets that review and advertise books to link to Bookshop instead, intercept potential Amazon customers.

Controversy 
Independent booksellers and independent publishers have expressed concern that Bookshop is, rather than benefiting them, a new long-term competitor in the publishing ecosystem.  

It has been estimated that sales through Bookshop.org may be 13-20% less profitable than if customers bought directly from an independent bookstore.  

This suggests however that the seller still retains 80-87% profit on a sale they might not otherwise get from foot traffic.

References

Further reading 

 
 
 
 
 
 

American companies established in 2020
Retail companies established in 2020
Internet properties established in 2020
E-commerce in the United States
Online bookstores

External links